A League of Their Own is an American period sports comedy drama television series co-created by Will Graham and Abbi Jacobson, who also stars. It is an adaptation of the 1992 film of the same name with new characters and storylines, about the formation of a World War II-era women's professional baseball team. Chanté Adams, D'Arcy Carden, Roberta Colindrez, Gbemisola Ikumelo, Kelly McCormack, Molly Ephraim, Melanie Field, and Priscilla Delgado also star. The series premiered with 8 episodes on August 12, 2022. In March 2023, the series was renewed for a four-episode second and final season.

Premise 
The series, set in 1943, is about the formation of the Rockford Peaches, a women's team in the nascent All-American Girls Professional Baseball League. While her husband is away at war, Carson Shaw leaves her small town life to pursue her dream of playing professional baseball. Maxine Chapman is an African-American woman obsessed with baseball, who cannot even get people to allow her to try out and struggles to get considered for any baseball team.

Cast

Main 
 Abbi Jacobson as Carson Shaw, the team's catcher. She has an on-going clandestine affair with Greta.
 Chanté Adams as Maxine "Max" Chapman, a talented pitcher trying to break into professional baseball. She hides her lesbian sexuality from friends and family.
 D'Arcy Carden as Greta Gill, a glamorous player of the Rockford Peaches. She encourages Carson to become confident in her sexuality, and in coaching the team.
 Gbemisola Ikumelo as Clance Morgan, Max's best friend and a comic book artist
 Roberta Colindrez as Lupe García, the team's Mexican-American pitcher, referred to as the "Spanish Striker"
 Kelly McCormack as Jess McCready, a hyper-competitive Canadian player. She is constantly being fined by Beverly for wearing pants in public.
  as Esti González, a young Cuban player who speaks almost no English
 Molly Ephraim as Maybelle Fox, a feisty player
 Melanie Field as Jo DeLuca, a fun-loving player and Greta's best friend
 Kate Berlant as Shirley Cohen, a highly anxious player

Recurring 

 Alex Désert as Edgar Chapman, Maxine's supportive father
 Saidah Arrika Ekulona as Toni Chapman, Maxine's mother and a hair salon owner who does not support her dreams to play baseball
 Nat Faxon as Marshall
 Dale Dickey as Beverly, the Rockford Peaches' chaperone
 Aaron Jennings as Guy, Clance's husband
 Kendall Johnson as Gary
 Lea Robinson as Bert Hart, Max's trans man uncle and Toni Chapman's sibling
 Patrice Covington as Gracie, Bert's romantic partner

Guest starring 
 Kevin Dunn as Morris Baker
 Nancy Lenehan as Vivienne Hughes
 Marinda Anderson as Leah
 Nick Offerman as Casey "Dove" Porter, the coach of the Rockford Peaches and a former professional baseball player
 Patrick J. Adams as Charlie, Carson's husband and a soldier on active duty in World War II
 Rosie O'Donnell as Vi, the owner and bartender of an underground lesbian and gay bar
 Andia Winslow as Esther, a pitcher in Red Wright's All-Stars Negro League
 Marquise Vilsón as Red Wright

In addition, Don Fanelli co-stars as Alan Baker, Lil Frex co-stars as Ana, and Rae Gray co-stars as Terri.

Episodes

Production

Development
In 2017 Abbi Jacobson and Will Graham approached Sony Pictures with the idea to reboot the late Penny Marshall's 1992 film A League of Their Own. Graham loved the film growing up and approached Jacobson with the idea for a contemporary reboot, expanding it to explore race and sexuality. Graham and Jacobson contacted Marshall (before her death in 2018) and Geena Davis to ask for their blessing before moving forward with the project.

Graham and Jacobson decided to expand the topics explored to include racism in the league as well as the stories of queer players. They hired a researcher to gather detailed information about the All-American Girls Professional Baseball League, and met with surviving players. Max's character is an amalgamation of three real-life Black women players from the Negro leagues: Toni Stone, Mamie Johnson, and Connie Morgan.

In March 2020, it was announced that the series was in development at Amazon. It is the second television adaptation of A League of Their Own, following a short-lived 1993 CBS series.

Jamie Babbit directed the pilot episode, which was shot in southern California. Babbit, Hailey Wierengo, and Elizabeth Koe are executive producers along with writer-producers Graham and Jacobson, who also co-stars. The series is Jacobson's second major project following Broad City, which ran for five seasons.

On August 6, 2020, it was announced that Amazon had ordered the one-hour comedy series. On March 14, 2023, Deadline reported that Amazon Prime Video renewed the series for a four-episode second and final season. Later the same day, showrunner Will Graham tweeted that the renewal news was an unofficial leak.

Casting
On February 14, 2020, D'Arcy Carden, Chanté Adams, Roberta Colindrez, Gbemisola Ikumelo, Kelly McCormack, Melanie Field, and Priscilla Delgado were announced. Nick Offerman was cast in June 2021 as Casey "Dove" Porter, the team's coach. Molly Ephraim and Kate Berlant were cast in recurring roles. In July 2021, Rosie O'Donnell announced she is set to guest star as a bartender at a local gay bar in the series. On July 6, 2021, Saidah Ekulona was announced as a recurring cast member. In September 2021, Patrick J. Adams, Patrice Covington, Lea Robinson, Andia Winslow, Rae Gray, and Lil Frex were cast in recurring capacities. On November 8, 2021, it was announced that Nat Faxon, Kevin Dunn, Marquise Vilsón, Marinda Anderson, Don Fanelli, and Nancy Lenehan were cast in recurring roles.

Filming 
After the pilot was shot in Los Angeles, filming was delayed due to the onset of the COVID-19 pandemic. Production took place in Pittsburgh, Pennsylvania, from mid-July through October 2021. Filming officially began on July 11, 2021, on the south side of Pittsburgh in the old Schwartz Market. Additional filming locations included Ambridge, the Fifth Street Park, Aliquippa at Morrell Field, and the city of Greensburg's Amtrak train station.

Release 
A world premiere screening took place at Tribeca Film Festival on June 13, 2022. To promote the show a 30th Anniversary screening of the original film was held in Los Angeles by Cinespia on August 7. The series premiered on Prime Video on August 12, 2022.

Reception
The review aggregator website Rotten Tomatoes gave the show an approval rating of 94% based on reviews from 83 critics, with an average rating of 7.7/10. The website's critics consensus reads, "A League of Their Own puts some spin on its pitch, lobbing a serialized expansion that swerves dangerously close to anachronism but hits home thanks to a roster filled with all-stars and a field rich with possibilities." Metacritic gave the series a weighted average score of 70 out of 100 based on 32 critics, indicating "generally favorable reviews".

Jenna Scherer rated the series an A- for The A.V. Club and stated: "That the show effortlessly weaves this diverse tapestry of women's stories is no easy feat. But League is funny as hell to boot, using a quasi-contemporary conversation style and modern slang (“Fucking fuckers!”) that feels oddly at home in the 1940s setting." Autostraddle critic Kayla Kumari Upadhyaya wrote positively about the LGBTQ+ content in the series: "Thirty years after the original, this story finally gets to be as gay as it should be...And it's not just the sheer number of queer characters but also the great space and weight given to queerness within just about every single plotline and subplot of this new A League of Their Own  that truly makes up for the lack of explicitly gay content in the original movie — and then some." Daniel D'Addario of Variety wrote that the show "feels a bit overextended" but hailed the acting: "there are strong performances throughout a deep ensemble and a winning eagerness to be openly, earnestly emotional." Linda Holmes of NPR also praised the acting and noted: "D'Arcy Carden, who a lot of TV audiences will mostly know as Janet ("not a robot" but ... kind of a robot) on The Good Place, is warm and bold and quite dreamy in this role — deeply human, in fact." In a less positive review, Ben Travers rated A League of Their Own a B- in IndieWire and wrote that splitting the narrative between two parallel story lines "creates pacing issues where things like the team's inaugural baseball game gets surprisingly short shrift" but also noted "most of its first season problems are common issues for freshman TV shows, and the Prime Video original smooths out with each passing episode." Peter Travers of ABC News also stated that the series "lacks the warm, gooey center of Marshall’s feel-good movie" but praised it as "refreshingly queer and diverse".

Awards and nominations 
 2022 – Honoree, Critics Choice Association Women's Committee Seal of Female Empowerment in Entertainment
 2022 – Honoree, Human Rights Campaign National Visibility Award
 2022 – Honoree, National Council of La Raza Voice and Visibility Award (for Abbi Jacobson)

References

External links 
 
 

2020s American comedy-drama television series
2020s American LGBT-related comedy television series
2022 American television series debuts
2020s American LGBT-related television series
American sports television series
Baseball television series
English-language television shows
Bisexuality-related television series
Lesbian-related television shows
LGBT sports
Transgender-related television shows
Live action television shows based on films
Television productions postponed due to the COVID-19 pandemic
Television series reboots
Television series set in 1943
Television shows filmed in California
Television shows filmed in Pittsburgh
Television shows set in Illinois
Television series by Amazon Studios
Television series by Sony Pictures Television
Amazon Prime Video original programming